William Smart may refer to:

Sports
Turkey Smart (William Smart, 1830–1919), British speed skater
Bill Smart (born 1948) Canadian runner

Others
William Smart (economist) (1853–1915), Scottish economist
William Marshall Smart (1889–1975), Scottish astronomer
William Jackson Smart, father of Sonora Smart Dodd
Billy Smart Sr. (1894–1966), British circus owner
Billy Smart Jr. (1934–2005), British circus performer

See also
William Smarte (c. 1530–1599), MP for Ipswich